Joseph H. Gaskill (May 23, 1851 – November 25, 1935) was a judge on the New Jersey Court of Common Pleas and justice of the New Jersey Supreme Court from 1893 to 1896.

His sons Thomas L. Gaskill and Nelson B. Gaskill were also lawyers.

Gaskill was a native of Mount Holly and later resided in Moorestown. He died of a heart ailment in his home in Moorestown at the age of 85, and was interred in Mount Holly Cemetery.

See also
List of justices of the Supreme Court of New Jersey
New Jersey Court of Errors and Appeals
Courts of New Jersey

References

1851 births
1935 deaths
New Jersey lawyers
New Jersey state court judges
Justices of the Supreme Court of New Jersey
People from Mount Holly, New Jersey
People from Moorestown, New Jersey